Scientriffic was a bi-monthly kids science magazine published by CSIRO Publishing. It was established in 1999 as a sister publication to The Helix, CSIRO Publishing's magazine for teens. Scientriffic targeted kids aged 7 and older.

The magazine was usually 40 pages long and trimmed to quarto paper size. It typically contained feature articles about science and mathematics of interest to kids.

The magazine was relaunched in July 2015 as Double Helix, combining both Scientriffic and The Helix into one magazine, starting from Issue 1, with 8 issues per year.

Editors
The final editor-in-chief was Sarah Kellett. Previous editors included Bianca Nogrady, Heather Catchpole, Cristy Burne, Tanya Patrick and Jasmine Fellows.

References

External links
 

1999 establishments in Australia
Children's magazines published in Australia
Bi-monthly magazines published in Australia
CSIRO
Eight times annually magazines
English-language magazines
Magazines established in 1999
Mass media in Canberra
Popular science magazines
Science and technology magazines